Adam Christian Cimber (born August 15, 1990) is an American professional baseball pitcher for the Toronto Blue Jays of Major League Baseball (MLB). He previously played for the San Diego Padres, Cleveland Indians, and Miami Marlins. Cimber is one of only a few major league pitchers with a submarine delivery.

Career

Amateur career
Cimber attended Puyallup High School in Puyallup, Washington. In high school, Cimber said he was very "small and skinny." His father suggested that to make the team, he would have to do something differently. He was intrigued by the sidearm delivery of Brad Ziegler of the Oakland A's and began experimenting in his backyard.

After high school, he enrolled at the University of Washington where he played college baseball from 2010 to 2012, compiling a 9–8 win–loss record and 4.15 earned run average (ERA) in 73 appearances. He then transferred to the University of San Francisco where he spent the 2013 season, posting a 6–3 record and 3.74 ERA in 57 innings pitched.

San Diego Padres
The San Diego Padres selected Cimber in the ninth round of the 2013 Major League Baseball draft. He signed and spent 2013 with the Eugene Emeralds where he was 3–1 with a 2.56 ERA in 28 relief appearances. In 2014, he played for the Lake Elsinore Storm where he pitched to a 5–3 record, 2.90 ERA, and 1.15 walks plus hits per inning pitched (WHIP) in 52 games, and in 2015, he pitched for both the San Antonio Missions and El Paso Chihuahuas where he posted a combined 4–2 record and 3.05 ERA in 46 total games between both teams. Cimber spent 2016 with both San Antonio and El Paso where he was 3–3 with a 3.77 ERA in 46 games and 2017 with the same two teams, going 5–2 with a 2.90 ERA with an 0.90 WHIP in  innings pitched. 

Cimber made the San Diego's Opening Day roster in 2018. He made his major league debut on March 29.

Cleveland Indians
On July 19, 2018, the Padres traded Cimber and Brad Hand to the Cleveland Indians for Francisco Mejía. He finished his 2018 season with a 3–8 record and a 3.42 ERA in seventy relief appearances, and shared the major league lead in intentional walks, with nine, while he had a total of only 17 walks.

With the 2020 Cleveland Indians, Cimber appeared in 14 games, compiling a 0–1 record with 3.97 ERA and five strikeouts in  innings pitched. Cimber was designated for assignment on November 25, 2020.

Miami Marlins
On November 30, 2020, the Indians traded Cimber to the Miami Marlins in exchange for cash considerations. In 33 appearances with Miami in 2021, Cimber pitched to a 2.88 ERA with 21 strikeouts in 34.1 innings of work.

Toronto Blue Jays
On June 29, 2021, Cimber was traded to the Toronto Blue Jays alongside Corey Dickerson in exchange for Joe Panik and minor league pitcher Andrew McInvale. Cimber made 39 appearances in 2021 for the Blue Jays, going 2–2 with a 1.69 ERA and 30 strikeouts. 

On March 22, 2022, Cimber signed a $1.575 million contract with the Blue Jays, avoiding salary arbitration.

Personal life
Cimber grew up a Seattle Mariners fan.

Cimber and his wife, Lauren, married in November 2018.

References

External links

1990 births
Living people
Baseball players from Portland, Oregon
Major League Baseball pitchers
San Diego Padres players
Cleveland Indians players
Miami Marlins players
Toronto Blue Jays players
Washington Huskies baseball players
San Francisco Dons baseball players
Eugene Emeralds players
Lake Elsinore Storm players
San Antonio Missions players
El Paso Chihuahuas players